Hong Kum-song (born 3 June 1990) is a North Korean footballer who plays as a midfielder or forward and is playing for April 25.

References

External links

1990 births
Living people
North Korean footballers
North Korea international footballers
North Korean expatriate footballers
Expatriate footballers in Latvia
Dinaburg FC players
Association football midfielders